The Old Central High School is a historic school building at 99 2nd Street in Pittsfield, Massachusetts.  Built in 1898, it is one of the most architecturally elaborate school buildings in the city.  The building was listed on the National Register of Historic Places in 1980.  It is now residential housing.

Description and history
Pittsfield's Old Central High School is located northeast of the city center, on the east side of the old town common.   It is a U-shaped 3-1/2 story masonry structure, finished primarily in cream-colored brick, with marble trim and terra cotta detailing.  It has a hipped roof pierced by dormers, and is set on a high sandstone foundation.  Its centered entrance is flanked by Corinthian columns and topped by a full entablature with balustrade.  The interior design echoes the color schemes of the exterior.

The land on which the school stands was originally part of Pittsfield's first cemetery, whose graves were relocated to the Pittsfield Cemetery on Wahconah Street between 1850 and 1872.  When the city's previous high school burned down in 1895,  the city held a design competition for its replacement.  Of 130 designs submitted, the city selected one by the New York City firm of Pierce & Brun.  It was completed in 1898 at a cost of $200,000, well over the $135,000 it had been estimated to cost.  A new high school was built in 1931, after which this building became a junior high school.  It sat vacant from 1953 to 1959, and in 1961 became the first home of Berkshire Community College.  It has since been converted to residences.

See also
National Register of Historic Places listings in Berkshire County, Massachusetts

References

School buildings on the National Register of Historic Places in Massachusetts
Public high schools in Massachusetts
Schools in Berkshire County, Massachusetts
Buildings and structures in Pittsfield, Massachusetts
National Register of Historic Places in Berkshire County, Massachusetts